El Pas de la Casa is a ski resort (part of the Grandvalira resort), town, and mountain pass in the Encamp parish of Andorra, lying on the border with France.

Overview
Its name literally translates as "the pass of the house" and refers to the fact that until the early twentieth century there was only a single shepherd's hut overlooking the pass. The pass marks the watershed of the Pyrenees, being the only point in Andorra where water drains into the Atlantic Ocean, and is the source of the Ariège river. At an elevation of  it is one of the highest points on the European road network. The pass is bypassed by the Envalira Tunnel.

The two main sources of wealth are trade and winter sports. The festa major de Sant Pere (Saint Peter's Feast) is held every 29 June in El Pas.

Ski resort

The ski resort of Pas de la Casa sits below the pass on the side closest to France, and below the Pic d'Envalira. Its popularity has grown with the burgeoning ski and snowboard industry in the principality: it is the highest resort in Andorra, has the best snow record, and is the easiest to get to from the Barcelona and Toulouse airports. Consequently, it attracts a large number of British and Irish winter sports enthusiasts, as well as French and Spanish ones. It is also favoured for its southern latitude and duty-free status, which for many overcome the drawbacks of the long airport transfer times.

The nightlife is particularly youthoriented, and a prevalence of red pistes perhaps makes the skiing more suited to intermediates than beginners or the most advanced.

A recent lift link to Soldeu via Grau Roig has created a linked skiing area ranging over almost 10% of Andorra's land area, though not all is skiable.

A bus from Toulouse Airport, Toulouse-Matabiau station and Barcelona Airport runs twice per day and can be booked online. Skis and snowboards can be transported on the bus. Toulouse Airport Transfers are also available.

Climate
Pas de la Casa has either a continental climate (Dfb) or oceanic climate (Cfb), depending on the isotherm (0 °C (32 °F)/-3 °C (27 °F) respectively) used, closely bordering their cold-summer variants (Dfc/Cfc respectively) however, since June/September average temperatures barely reach over 10 °C (50 °F), with areas at slightly higher elevations ultimately being lower than that and falling into the cold-summer variants.

Precipitation is relatively abundant year-round, with a notable February dip in precipitation. Summers are generally cool thanks to the high elevation of the town (2080m), and winters often under freezing, with regular snowfall and occasional snowstorms, with the temperature dropping further to below -10 °C (14 °F) some nights during those.

Demographics

Languages
French is the main language of communication next to the official language, Catalan.

Notable people 

 Laure Soulie (born 1987 in El Pas de la Casa) is a retired Andorran biathlete, competed at the 2014 Winter Olympics

Gallery

See also

 List of highest paved roads in Europe
 List of mountain passes
 Vallnord Pal-Arinsal Ordino-Arcalis

References

External links

Populated places in Andorra
Ski areas and resorts in Andorra
Encamp
Andorra–France border crossings
Landforms of Andorra
Casa
Casa